The Concordat on Openness on Animal Research is a UK initiative of scientific organizations, funders and providers who directly carry out, or whose members or beneficiaries carry out animal research. It is a pledge by signatory organizations to offer the public greater information about research that involves animals.

The Concordat on Openness on Animal Research in the UK was established in 2014 to provide "measurable steps" for researchers that use animals in the UK, to talk openly about their work.  It is part of the UK biomedical community's "openness agenda", which encourages researchers and technical staff who work in animal testing or research to talk openly about why their work is important to them.

At its launch, the Concordat on Openness' authors said that signatory organizations should "provide accurate descriptions of the benefits, harms and limitations of research, be realistic about the potential outputs of such research and be open about its impact on animal welfare and the ethical considerations involved". Signatories are strongly encouraged to offer access to their animal research facilities to journalists, MPs, and local school, patient and community groups and are required to have public-facing webpages that describe their relationship to the use of animals in scientific research, and state why they feel their practices are justified. Ideally, if they use animals in research within their own organization the webpages will state how many they use in a year and how they ensure that their animals are well-cared for. Many also explain UK regulations and practices that govern how animals in science are protected as well as highlighting their own areas of research.

Background 
In 2012 a UK opinion poll showed that two thirds of people did not trust the regulations that protected the animals used in science, and half did not feel sufficiently informed on the subject. A concerned group of UK research organizations including universities, medical research charities and government research institutes that use animals in scientific research they would address the lack of public communication about the use of animals in bio-medical research. The group developed a "concordat" to outline measurable steps that organizations could take to be more open with the public about how and why animals are used in scientific research.

It is one of several UK higher education research related Concordats, supported by UK Research and Innovation (UKRI), alongside the Concordat for Career Development of Researchers, the Concordat to Support Research Integrity, the Concordat on Open Research Data and the Concordat on Engaging the Public with Research.

The wording of the Concordat on Openness and accompanying guidance was developed by governance groups chaired by Geoff Watts and Wendy Jarrett. In drafting the Concordat these groups looked to the public, the scientific community and journalists to find out what steps needed to be taken an what openness meant to them. The Concordat on Openness on Animal Research in the UK was signed by 72 signatory organizations when it launched in 2014, and contains four commitments:

 We will be clear about when, how and why we use animals in research
 We will enhance our communications with the media and the public about our research using animals
 We will be proactive in providing opportunities for the public to find out about research using animals
 We will report on progress annually and share our experiences

Adherence to the four commitments is voluntary and self-reported by signatories annually. The information they provide is compiled into annual reports. Since 2016 it has been mandatory for all signatories are required to have publicly accessible information about how, when and why they use animals in research on their websites.

The UK's change in approach to communicating about animals in research, and the information available to the public about how animals are used in research has been noted around the world, with calls to develop similar initiatives in the USA and in Australia and New Zealand. Critics say that the "openness" championed by the concordat on openness is too selective to make a real difference, champions the status quo, and does not do enough to challenge the practices of organizations that use animals in research or hold them to account.

Signatories

Universities

Learned Societies

Commercial Organizations

Trade Associations and Advocacy Groups

Charities

Research Institutes

Government departments and agencies

Administration and activities 
The Concordat on Openness on Animal Research in the UK is run and administered by Understanding Animal Research. Awards to celebrate innovation and best practices around openness are held annually in December, coinciding with release of the annual report. In 2018 signatories of the Concordat on Openness on Animal Research publicly announced the top ten UK universities for animal research, stating that these universities, all of which appear in the QS 2018 World University Ranking Top 200, carried out over a third of all animal research conducted in the UK in 2017.

References 

Animal welfare
Animal rights
Animal testing